Ex Machina is a portion of the phrase deus ex machina, meaning "god from the machine". It may refer to:

Fiction
 Ex Machina (comics), a comic book series by Brian K. Vaughan and Tony Harris
 Ex Machina (film), a 2014 British science fiction film
 Ex Machina (Star Trek), a 2004 Star Trek novel by Christopher L. Bennett
 Appleseed Ex Machina, a 2007 anime film and the sequel to the 2004 film Appleseed
 Ex Machina (role-playing game), a post cyberpunk role-playing game

Music
 Ex machina (group), German music group
 Ex Machina (Man or Astro-man? EP), a 1998 EP by Man or Astro-man?

Companies
 Ex Machina, a theatre company founded by director Robert Lepage in Quebec City, Canada
 Ex Machina, a French 3D animation studio, also known as Sogitec

See also
 Deus ex machina (disambiguation)